PRES can be short for:

Pôle de recherche et d'enseignement supérieur
Posterior reversible encephalopathy syndrome
Pregnenolone sulfate (more commonly called PregS)